
Year 398 BC was a year of the pre-Julian Roman calendar. At the time, it was known as the Year of the Tribunate of Potitus, Medullinus, Lactucinus, Fidenas, Camillus and Cornutus (or, less frequently, year 356 Ab urbe condita). The denomination 398 BC for this year has been used since the early medieval period, when the Anno Domini calendar era became the prevalent method in Europe for naming years.

Events 
 By place 
 Sicily 
 Dionysius, tyrant of Syracuse, breaks his peace treaty with Carthage and strikes at Carthaginian cities in the western corner of Sicily which have been weakened by the plague. There is a massacre of Carthaginians in many of these cities. Motya, with its fine harbour, is attacked and captured.

Births

Deaths

References